Roland Batik (born August 19, 1951 in Vienna) is an Austrian pianist, composer, jazz musician and piano teacher. In the style of his compositions, he is seeking a fusion of classical elements with Jazz. Among other, his music is frequently broadcast in the Austrian radio program Ö1.

External links
 http://www.rolandbatik.com
 Entry at Music Information Center Austria
 Discography at amazon.com

1951 births
Living people
21st-century pianists